Justice League International (JLI) is a fictional DC comics superhero team that succeeded the original Justice League from the late 1980s to the early 2000s. The team enjoyed several comic books runs, the first being written by Keith Giffen and J. M. DeMatteis, with art by Kevin Maguire, created in 1987. Due to editorial conflicts, the team's new makeup was based largely on newer characters, such as Booster Gold, and recent acquisitions from other comic book companies, such as The Blue Beetle.

In 2010 and 2011, the team experienced a resurgence as part of the Blackest Night and New 52 comic runs.

Publication history
Following the events of the company-wide crossovers Crisis on Infinite Earths and Legends, Justice League of America writer J. M. DeMatteis was paired with writer Keith Giffen and artist Kevin Maguire on a new Justice League series. However, at the time, most of the core Justice League characters were unavailable. Superman was limited to John Byrne's reboot, George Pérez was relaunching Wonder Woman and Mike Baron was launching the Wally West version of the Flash.

As a result, the initial team consisted of:
 Batman: Series editor Denny O'Neil, taking pity on the new creative team, allowed Batman to be used in the series.
 Black Canary: Dinah Lance was written as a strong feminist and often clashed with chauvinist Guy Gardner.
 The Blue Beetle: A recent acquisition from Charlton Comics.
 Captain Marvel: No longer a separate personality, this version focuses on his alter ego's naiveté.
 Doctor Fate (Linda Strauss): The inclusion of Dr. Fate coincided with a miniseries written by DeMatteis and Giffen. 
 Doctor Light: First appearing in Crisis on Infinite Earths, Kimiyo Hoshi briefly joins the League.
 Guy Gardner: Editor Andy Helfer suggested using Guy Gardner over the more well-known Hal Jordan.
 Martian Manhunter: The only connection to the previous iteration of the Justice League. He soon develops a love for Oreo cookies.
 Mister Miracle: The world's greatest escape artist. His wife, Big Barda, and friend, Oberon, are also associated with the League.

The resulting comedic tone was Giffen's idea, introducing new characterizations to old characters: Guy Gardner was now a loutish hothead, Booster Gold was greedier and more inept than he had been in Dan Jurgens' series and Captain Marvel displayed a childlike personality.

When Black Canary resigns, Green Flame and Ice Maiden (both from the Global Guardians) join. They eventually change their names to Fire and Ice and become long standing members within the team.

The series was nominated as "Best New Series" in 1988 by the Harvey Awards, but lost to Paul Chadwick's Concrete. It also featured Adam Hughes' first work for a major comic book publisher.

They fight the Champions of Angor, other-dimensional superheroes intent on destroying all nuclear weapons. Bialya's dictator Rumaan Harjavti takes advantage of the Champions to eliminate his rivals. In Russia, the League fights the Rocket Red Brigade, until Mikhail Gorbachev allows them to help. Wandjina sacrifices himself to stop a nuclear meltdown and the League are sent home by international law. Millionaire entrepreneur Maxwell Lord takes an interest in the team, breaching their security and suggesting Booster Gold as a new member.

Booster proves himself in combat against the Royal Flush Gang and Lord declares himself their press liaison. The Martian Manhunter saves the world when they battle against a conscious psychic plague and he consumes it. Gardner challenges Batman to a fight over leadership, but Batman knocks him out in one punch. Doctor Fate is captured by the Gray Man, a rogue servant to the Lords of Order. Teaming up with the Creeper, they release Fate and stop the Gray Man from taking over the world.

Earth is attacked by a mysterious satellite and the League travels into space. Miracle recognizes it as a modified New Genesis device and neutralizes it. They return home as heroes. Maxwell Lord introduces a proposal to get United Nations funding and they are given sponsorship in exchange for government regulation. This plan allows them to act as an independent city-state with worldwide embassies. Captain Atom and Rocket Red #7 are added to the team by the United States and Russia, respectively. Captain Marvel and Doctor Fate quit the team for personal reasons; Batman steps down as leader, appointing the Martian Manhunter to replace him. They are reintroduced to the world as Justice League International. Despite a series of embarrassing accidents, they successfully move in to embassies around the world. This includes Moscow, New York City and Paris.

With issue #7, the series was renamed Justice League International to reflect the team's new international status. The name change spawned the term "JLI", which is used when referring to this period in Justice League history. The series was again renamed following the launch of Justice League Europe in 1989. The series was known as Justice League America until its cancellation in 1996.

"Justice League: Breakdowns"
"Breakdowns" was a 16-issue crossover between the Justice League America (#53–60) and Justice League Europe (#29–36) titles, changing the tone of both series from a humorous one to a more serious one and introducing new creative teams to both series. The major events that occurred were the following:

 Maxwell Lord is initially in a coma from a failed assassination attempt. He is later possessed by JLE foe Dreamslayer of the Extremists. Following the end of the "Breakdowns" saga, Maxwell Lord has no more mental powers, apparently drained completely when possessed by Dreamslayer.
 The Queen Bee, ruler of the country Bialya, is killed in a coup d'état led by Sumaan Harjavti, the twin brother of the original dictator, Rumaan.
 Despero awakens and escapes Manga Khan's starship to wreak havoc on New York City, seeking vengeance against the Justice League. A force of the Justice League's best (the Martian Manhunter, Power Girl, Fire, Rocket Red, Metamorpho, the Flash, Guy Gardner, Major Disaster), along with the Conglomerate (led by Booster Gold) and Lobo, were unable to stop him. Ultimately, it was Kilowog and L-Ron who subdued Despero by transferring L-Ron's consciousness into the cybernetic control collar that remained around Despero's neck.
 While possessing Maxwell Lord's body, Dreamslayer kidnaps and later murders Mitch Wacky on the island of KooeyKooeyKooey, where the Blue Beetle and Booster Gold previously attempted to open a resort called "Club JLI". Using Lord's persona, Dreamslayer lures a large portion of the Justice League to the island and takes mental control of them, making them the "new Extremists".
 The Silver Sorceress, one of the former Champions of Angor and a Justice League member, dies defeating Dreamslayer. Her gravesite is on the island of KooeyKooeyKooey.
 The United Nations withdraws its support from the Justice League and it disbands. The Martian Manhunter seemingly takes a leave of absence, although he later re-emerges under the persona of Bloodwynd.

Expansion

The Justice League titles continued to expand into the early to mid-1990s. Titles included: Justice League America, Justice League Europe, Justice League Task Force, Extreme Justice and Justice League Quarterly. Justice League Europe was later retitled to become the second volume of Justice League International.

In the latter part of the series, more recognizable characters, including Superman, Wonder Woman, Green Lantern and Aquaman, joined, followed by lesser known characters such as Bloodwynd, Maya, Maxima, Nuklon, Obsidian, the Tasmanian Devil and Triumph. Longtime JLI-era characters such as Captain Atom, Martian Manhunter and Power Girl were revised and revamped.

By 1996, with the commercial success of the series fading, each of the titles was eventually cancelled.

Miniseries
In 2003, Giffen, DeMatteis, and Maguire reunited for the six-issue miniseries Formerly Known as the Justice League. This depicted Maxwell Lord trying to get the gang back together as The Super Buddies – a hero-for-hire group that operated out of a strip mall. 2005 saw a second storyline, I Can't Believe It's Not the Justice League, by the same creative team published in the pages of JLA Classified. This tale told a story of the characters attempt to rescue Ice from Hell.

Return
Following Blackest Night, DC launched two alternating 24-issue bi-weekly comic book miniseries, Brightest Day and Justice League: Generation Lost, written by Keith Giffen and Judd Winick. This second series features Captain Atom, Booster Gold, the new Blue Beetle Jaime Reyes, Fire, Ice and a new Rocket Red (by the name of Gavril Ivanovich) and essentially saw the return of Justice League International, as explained by Giffen:

Over the course of the series, Power Girl and Batman joined the group as well, with Wonder Woman appearing in the book's final three issues. The title was heavily tied to Winick's run on Power Girl, which had the title character dealing with villains connected to Maxwell Lord's plans in Generation Lost, and eventually had her rejoin Justice League International after a crossover between the two titles. The title also indirectly tied into Odyssey, a storyline published in Wonder Woman that saw the title character being removed from history with her existence forgotten by most of her fellow heroes. This formed the basis of the book's finale, with the members of the Justice League International racing to track down Wonder Woman before Lord could find her and kill her. Plot threads from Kingdom Come and The OMAC Project also appeared.

Generation Lost ended with a teaser that a new Justice League International series from The New 52 would be coming in a few months (with Booster Gold as leader).

The New 52

As part of DC's 2011 New 52 relaunch of all of its monthly books, Justice League International was relaunched in September 2011, after the conclusion of the Flashpoint storyline, written by Dan Jurgens and drawn by Aaron Lopresti.

This version of Justice League International is formed by United Nations director Andre Briggs as a UN-controlled counterpart to the original Justice League and is based out of the Hall of Justice. The founding members of the team consist of Booster Gold, Fire, Ice, Rocket Red (Gavril Ivanovich), Green Lantern (Guy Gardner), Vixen, August General in Iron and Godiva, who are recruited to the team due to having their identities publicly known. Batman is denied membership due to having a secret identity, but is allowed to accompany the group as part of an effort to foster good relations between the JLI and the original Justice League. The team goes on to defeat the Signal Men and the alien conqueror Peraxxus.

During a press conference outside the Hall of Justice, Rocket Red is killed when a bomb explodes, while Fire, Ice and Vixen are hospitalized and become comatose. This leads Booster Gold to recruit Batwing, OMAC and Firehawk to the team.

DC canceled Justice League International in 2012, concluding with issue #12 and Justice League International Annual (vol. 2) #1 in August.

Writers
 Keith Giffen: Justice League / Justice League International / Justice League America #1–60, Justice League / Justice League International / Justice League America Annual #1–5, Justice League International Special #1
 J.M. DeMatteis: Justice League / Justice League International / Justice League America #1–60, Justice League / Justice League International / Justice League America Annual #1–5 
 Dan Jurgens: Justice League America #61–77, Justice League Spectacular #1, Justice League International (vol. 3) #1–12
 Dan Vado: Justice League America #78–91, Annual #8
 Christopher Priest: Justice League America #92, Annual #10, Justice League International (vol. 2) #68 
 Gerard Jones: Justice League America #0, 93–113, Annual #9, Justice League Europe / Justice League International (vol. 2) #37–67, Annual #4–5, Justice League Spectacular #1

Collected editions

In other media

Justice League International appears in Batman: The Brave and the Bold. Introduced in the episode "Darkseid Descending!", this version of the team is assembled by Batman, Aquaman, and the Martian Manhunter to combat Darkseid following an unspecified incident that led to the Justice League's disbandment, initially consists of them, the Blue Beetle, Booster Gold, Guy Gardner, Fire, and Ice, and are based in the Justice League Satellite. In subsequent episodes, Rip Hunter, Robin, Kid Flash, Superman, Wonder Woman, Plastic Man, the Green Arrow, Captain Atom, Captain Marvel, and Rocket Red have joined the team.

Reception
Martin A. Stever reviewed Justice League International Space Gamer/Fantasy Gamer No. 83. Stever commented that "thanks to clever characterization and wit, this creative team makes team moving day as exciting and as much fun as a brush with Armageddon".

See also
 List of Justice League members

References

External links
 Justice League International at the DC Comics Database
 Justice League International at the DCU Guide
 

International, Justice League
Comics by Dan Jurgens
Comics by J. M. DeMatteis
Comics by Keith Giffen
Defunct American comics

it:Justice League International